Émilie Foster is a former Canadian politician, who was elected to the National Assembly of Quebec in the 2018 provincial election. She represented the electoral district of Charlevoix–Côte-de-Beaupré as a member of the Coalition Avenir Québec. She did not run for re-election in the Quebec 2022 provincial election.

Electoral record

References

Living people
Coalition Avenir Québec MNAs
21st-century Canadian politicians
Women MNAs in Quebec
People from Capitale-Nationale
Year of birth missing (living people)
Université Laval alumni
21st-century Canadian women politicians